The Ministry of Foreign Affairs of the Islamic Emirate of Afghanistan (MoFA) is the cabinet ministry responsible for managing the foreign relations of Afghanistan.

On 11 January 2023, the ministry was bombed.

List of ministers

Notes

See also
 Cabinet of Afghanistan

References

External links
 
 Consular Affairs Division
 

Foreign Affairs
Foreign relations of Afghanistan
Afghanistan